American Cove was a hamlet on the Labrador coast as early as 1911. The nearest port of call was Grady, Newfoundland and Labrador.

See also 
 List of ghost towns in Newfoundland and Labrador

Ghost towns in Newfoundland and Labrador